Washington Urrutia Vistoso (born 16 August 1942) was a Chilean manager.

Club career
Urrutia was assistant manager of Luis Álamos (1960–1966), Alejandro Scopelli (1967–1968) and Ulises Ramos (1969–1972), being Universidad de Chile’s caretaker manager in 1968. Five years later, he joined Santiago Wanderers in 1973.

He is the current president of the section sports at the Universidad Mayor.

References

Living people
1944 births
Chilean football managers
Universidad de Chile managers
Santiago Wanderers managers
Chilean Primera División managers
Chile national under-20 football team managers